Laos competed in the Olympic Games for the first time at the 1980 Summer Olympics in Moscow, USSR.

Results by event

Athletics 
Men's 100 metres
 Soutsakhone Somninhom
 Heat — 11.69 (→ did not advance)

Men's 200 metres
 Sitthixay Sacpraseuth
 Heat — 24.28 (→ did not advance)

Men's 800 metres
 Vongdeuane Phongsavanh 
 Heat — 2:05.5  (→ did not advance)

Men's 20 km Walk
 Thipsamay Chanthaphone
 Final — 2:20:22.0 (→ 25th place)

Women's 100 metres
 Seuth Khampa
 Heat — 14.62 (→ did not advance)

 Boualong Boungnavong
 Vongdeuane Phongsavanh

Boxing 
Men's Light Flyweight (48 kg)
 Singkham Phongprathith
 First Round — Lost to Pedro Manuel Nieves (Venezuela) after referee stopped contest in first round

Men's Bantamweight (54 kg)
 Souneat Ouphaphone
 First Round — Bye
 Second Round — Lost to Fayez Zaghloul (Syria) on points (5-0)

Men's Featherweight (57 kg)
 Takto Youtiya Homrasmy
 First Round — Bye
 Second Round — Lost to Winfred Kabunda (Zambia) after referee stopped contest in first round

Men's Lightweight (60 kg)
 Bounphisith Songkhamphou 
 First Round — Lost to Kazimierz Adach (Poland) after referee stopped contest in second round

Men's Light-Welterweight (63,5 kg)
 Kampanath
 First Round — Lost to Farez Halabi (Syria) on points (2-3)

References 
 Official Olympic Reports

Nations at the 1980 Summer Olympics
1980
1980 in Laos